Xavier Niodogo is a Burkinabé diplomat.

From 28 May 2003 to 2011 he was Ambassador Extraordinary and Plenipotentiary of Burkina Faso to Germany, with concurrent accreditation to the Russian Federation and the Ukraine.

References

Ambassadors of Burkina Faso to Russia
Ambassadors of Burkina Faso to Ukraine
Ambassadors of Burkina Faso to Germany
Living people
1953 births
21st-century Burkinabé people